Reasons to be Cheerful: The Life and Work of Barney Bubbles is a book about British graphic artist Barney Bubbles (July 1942 – November 1983).

Written by Paul Gorman, the book incorporates an essay by Peter Saville, a foreword by Malcolm Garrett, an introduction by Billy Bragg and a conversation with US practitioner Art Chantry.

It has been published in two editions by independent British imprint Adelita; the first came out in November 2008, the second in December 2010.

Books about visual art
2008 non-fiction books
British biographies